2363 Cebriones  is a large Jupiter trojan from the Trojan camp, approximately  in diameter. It was discovered on 4 October 1977, by astronomers at the Purple Mountain Observatory in Nanking, China. The dark D-type asteroid is one of the 40 largest Jupiter trojans and has a rotation period of 20 hours. It was named after Cebriones, Hektor's charioteer from Greek mythology.

Orbit and classification 

Cebriones is a dark Jovian asteroid orbiting in the trailing Trojan camp at Jupiter's  Lagrangian point, 60° behind its orbit in a 1:1 resonance (see Trojans in astronomy). It is also a non-family asteroid of the Jovian background population.

It orbits the Sun at a distance of 5.0–5.4 AU once every 11 years and 11 months (4,338 days; semi-major axis of 5.21 AU). Its orbit has an eccentricity of 0.04 and an inclination of 32° with respect to the ecliptic. The body's observation arc begins with a precovery taken at Palomar Observatory in August 1953, more than 24 years prior to its official discovery observation at Nanking.

Naming 

This minor planet was named from Greek mythology after King Priam's illegitimate son, Cebriones (Kebriones). He was the half-brother of Hektor and his final charioteer during the Trojan War, wounded in the duel between Hektor and Patroclus. The official naming citation was published by the Minor Planet Center on 1 August 1981.

Physical characteristics 

In the Tholen classification, Cebriones is a dark D-type asteroid.

Rotation period 

In February 1992, a rotational lightcurve of Cebriones was obtained from photometric observations by Stefano Mottola and Anders Erikson using the now decommissioned ESO 1-metre telescope at La Silla Observatory in Chile. Lightcurve analysis gave a rotation period of 20.05 hours with a brightness variation of 0.22 magnitude, superseding a previous measurement of a fragmentary lightcurve that gave 3.8 hours only.

In May 2008 and September 2010, observations by Brian A. Skiff and Adrián Galád gave a concurring period of 20.081 and 20.5 hours with an amplitude of 0.22 and 0.13, respectively.

Diameter and albedo 

According to the surveys carried out by the Infrared Astronomical Satellite IRAS, the Japanese Akari satellite and the NEOWISE mission of NASA's Wide-field Infrared Survey Explorer, Cebriones measures between 81.84 and 95.98 kilometers in diameter and its surface has an albedo between 0.044 and 0.0599.

The Collaborative Asteroid Lightcurve Link adopts the results obtained by IRAS, that is, an albedo of 0.0599 and a diameter of 81.84 kilometers based on an absolute magnitude of 9.11.

References

External links 
 (2363) Cebriones occultaion path on 1 Mar 2017, asteroidoccultation.com
 Asteroid Lightcurve Database (LCDB), query form (info )
 (2363) Cebriones, Dictionary of Minor Planet Names
 Dictionary of Minor Planet Names, Google books
 Discovery Circumstances: Numbered Minor Planets (1)-(5000) – Minor Planet Center
 
 

002363
002363
Named minor planets
002363
19771004